Adrián Riera Torrecillas (born 19 April 1996) is a Spanish professional footballer who plays as a winger for Greek Super League club Asteras Tripolis.

Career 
Born in Murcia, Riera was a Levante youth graduate. He made his senior debut with the reserves on 22 August 2015, playing the last six minutes in a 0–1 Segunda División B away loss against Hércules.

On 1 February 2016, after being sparingly used, Riera was loaned to fellow league team La Roda until the end of the season. The following July, he moved to Getafe's B-team in Tercera División, after terminating his contract with the Granotes.

Riera returned to the third division on 11 July 2017, after agreeing to a contract with Formentera. The following 31 January, he moved to Toledo in the same category, but spent the remainder of the campaign sidelined after suffering a knee injury.

In August 2018, Riera joined another reserve team, Villarreal B also in division three. Roughly one year later, he terminated his contract with the Yellow Submarine and moved abroad, signing a two-year contract with Asteras Tripolis of the Greek Super League.

Riera made his professional debut on 24 August 2019, starting in a 0–1 away loss against Olympiacos. His first goal came on 13 September of the following year in the 2020–21 season opener, the only one of a home win against Panathinaikos.

On 14 July 2021, Asteras Tripolis announced the extension of Riera's contract with the club for two more years, until June 2023.

References

External links

1996 births
Living people
Footballers from Murcia
Spanish footballers
Association football wingers
Segunda División B players
Tercera División players
Atlético Levante UD players
La Roda CF players
Getafe CF B players
SD Formentera players
CD Toledo players
Villarreal CF B players
Super League Greece players
Asteras Tripolis F.C. players
Spanish expatriate footballers
Expatriate footballers in Greece
Spanish expatriate sportspeople in Greece